Sari-Sari Channel is a 24-hour general entertainment channel under a joint-venture between Cignal TV and Viva Communications. Named after the Philippine Sari-sari store, it offers a smorgasbord of shows from the portfolios of Viva TV and TV5. The channel's content include archive shows and movies from Viva Television and Viva Films, original movies from Studio5, the film production arm of TV5 Network and in-house original productions in partnership of the latter's talents.

In 2015, Sari-Sari Channel was delegated as the official production outfit to handle all entertainment programs of TV5 after Viva Communications chief Vicente "Vic" del Rosario, Jr. was appointed as the network's entertainment head, replacing Wilma Galvante, following the retrenchment on TV5's main entertainment department.

Starting October 21, 2017, selected original serials from the channel is broadcast on TV5 under the Sari-Sari Weekend on TV5 block. It is also carried over to its overseas counterpart Kapatid Channel since 2018.

Since 2020, after Cignal TV took over the TV5 Network's management and operations, most episodes of Cignal-TV5-Viva produced shows are currently aired on this channel the next day after being shown on TV5 with simulcast airings from PBN-10 & IBC-13, until end on May 31, 2024.

Programming

TeleMovies
 When I Fall in Love
 The Lady Next Door
 The Replacement Bride
 Bawat Sandali
 Kuya and Me 
 My Only Love 
 Dalawang Gabi 
 Frenemies in Love 
 Mariposa
 Sa Bawat Patak ng Ulan

Series
 Viva Drama Specials
 Takot Ka Ba Sa Dilim?
 Dear Heart
 Midnight DJ
 Class 3-C Has A Secret
 Barrio Kulimlim
 The Mysterious Case of Ana Madrigal
 From the Beautiful Country
 Ang Kwarto Sa May Hagdanan
 Wives of House of No. 2
 Where is Franco?
 Hourglass
 10 Signatures to Bargain With God
 Ha-pi House
 Red Envelope
 Tabi Po
 Alabang Girls
 Never Say Goodbye
 Mac & Chiz
 Lokomoko High
 Diary of a 30 Something
 2 1/2 Daddies
 Tukhang
 The Feb 15 Club
 Sa Ngalan ng Anak
 Challenge Accepted
 Sinugatang Puso
 Pag-Ibig Hanggang Kamatayan
 The Kasambahays 1&2
 Taddy Taddy Po
 Kalye Wars
 Operation Break the Casanova's Heart 
 Brush
 Job Order
 Blue Jeans
 The Legal Mistress
 Will You Marry Me
 Destiny Guard
 Cuerpo Y Alma
 Ghost Adventures
 Tasya Fantasya
 #Parang Normal Activity
 The Last Woman Standing
 A Not-So-Fake Love Story 
 Beh Buti Nga
 Glamorosa
 Nandito Ako 
 Kagat ng Dilim 
 Masked Singer Pilipinas
 Born To Be A Star
 The Wall
 1000 Heartbeats
 Encounter
 Puto
 Di Na Muli

Movie blocks
 Sari-Saring Sine

Notes

See also
TV5
One Sports
BuKo
Colours (defunct)
Viva Entertainment
Jeepney TV
Heart of Asia Channel
Pinoy Hits
Fox Filipino (defunct)

References

TV5 Network channels
Viva Entertainment
Television networks in the Philippines
Television channels and stations established in 2016
2016 establishments in the Philippines
Cignal TV